Latchireddipalem is a village in Rowthulapudi Mandal, Kakinada district in the state of Andhra Pradesh in India.

Geography 

Demographics 
Latchireddipalem Village has a population of 3,078, out of which 1549 are male and 1529 are female. Population of children below 6 years of age are 424. The literacy rate of the village is 52.07%.

References 

Villages in Rowthulapudi mandal